SHL Rookie of the Year is an annual award in the Swedish Hockey League (SHL), presented by Svenska Spel since the 1989–90 season. Djurgårdens IF has had eight winners of this award, more than any other team.

Winners

References

Awards established in 1990
Swedish ice hockey trophies and awards
Swedish Hockey League
Rookie player awards
1990 establishments in Sweden